Vigneaux may refer to:

Caroline Vigneaux (born 1975), French actor, lawyer
Nicolás Vigneaux (born 1997), Chilean actor
Les Vigneaux, a French commune

See also
 Vigneau (disambiguation)